This is a list of broadcast station classes applicable in much of North America under international agreements between the United States, Canada and Mexico. Effective radiated power (ERP) and height above average terrain (HAAT) are listed unless otherwise noted.

All radio and television stations within  of the US-Canada or US-Mexico border must get approval by both the domestic and foreign agency. These agencies are Industry Canada/Canadian Radio-television and Telecommunications Commission (CRTC) in Canada, the Federal Communications Commission (FCC) in the US, and the Federal Telecommunications Institute (IFT) in Mexico.

AM

Station class descriptions 
All domestic (United States) AM stations are classified as A, B, C, or D.  

 A (formerly I) — clear-channel stations — 10 kW to 50 kW, 24 hours. 
Class A stations are only protected within a  radius of the transmitter site. 
The old Class I was divided into three: Class I-A, I-B and I-N. NARBA distinguished between Class I-A, which were true clear-channel stations that did not share their channel with another Class I station, and Class I-B, in which a station operated with 50 kW at night but shared its channel with at least one other I-B station, requiring directional operation. This distinction was superseded by the Regional Agreement for the Medium Frequency Broadcasting Service in Region 2 (Rio Agreement), which instituted the current class system.
The former Class I-As are omnidirectional, with the exception of 870 WWL New Orleans and 1030 WBZ Boston, which use directional antennas to put a better signal over their largest population areas. 
Most former Class I-Bs are directional at night, although a few are also directional during days. (A handful of I-Bs did not have to use directional antennas:  680 KNBR San Francisco, 810 WGY Schenectady, 850 KOA Denver, 940 XEQ Mexico City, 1070 KNX Los Angeles and 1070 CBA Moncton.  KNX and CBA were far enough apart that both could operate without using a directional antenna.  XEQ is far enough from Montreal that it did not need a directional antenna.  KNBR and KOA are the only Class Is on their frequency but share those frequencies with several Class II-Bs.)
Former Class I-N stations exist only in Alaska, where they are too remote to interfere with other clear-channel stations in the contiguous 48 states. They are only held to Class B efficiency standards (although higher efficiency is acceptable).
No new Class A stations are licensed in the conterminous United States, although the FCC states it may be possible to license additional Class A stations in Alaska.
 B (formerly II and III) — regional stations — 250 W to 50 kW, 24 hours. 
Stations on the AM expanded band, 1610 kHz to 1700 kHz, are limited to 10 kW days and 1 kW nights, non-directionally.
Several expanded band stations operate DA-N or even DA-2 with up to 10 kW during all hours, after providing proof that such operations will not cause co- or adjacent-channel interference. 
If under 250 W at night, the antenna must be efficient enough to radiate more than 140.82 mV/m at 1 km.
 C (formerly IV) — local unlimited-time stations — 250 W to 1 kW, 24 hours. 
Class C stations that were licensed at 100 W are grandfathered. 
Rare Class Cs operate with directional arrays, such as KYPA and KHCB.
 D (formerly II-D, II-S, III-S) — current and former daytimers — Daytime 250 W to 50 kW, nighttime under 250 W or off-air.
Field strength is limited to 140 mV/m (millivolts per meter) at 1 km. 
No new class D stations are licensed, with the exception of Class B stations that are downgrading their nighttime operations to Class D (i.e., less than 250 W). The station's daytime operation is then also reclassified as Class D.
If a Class D station is on the air at night, it is not protected from any co-channel interference.
 TIS/HAR — travelers' information stations / highway advisory radio stations — Up to 10 W transmitter output power. Stations within US national parks are licensed by NTIA and not the FCC.
 Unlicensed broadcasting — (see low-power broadcasting) — 100 mW DC input to final amplifier with a  maximum length radiator, no license needed, may be measured at edge of campus for school stations

Notes:
 In the Western Hemisphere (ITU region 2), medium wave AM broadcasts are on channels spaced 10 kHz apart from 530 kHz to 1700 kHz, with certain classes restricted to subsets of the available frequencies.
 With few exceptions, Class A stations can be found only on the frequencies of 540 kHz, 640 to 780 kHz, 800 to 900 kHz, 940 kHz, 990 to 1140 kHz, 1160 to 1220 kHz, and 1500 to 1580 kHz. The exceptions are cited in relevant international treaties.
 While US and Canadian Class A stations are authorized to operate at a maximum of 50,000 watts day and night (and a minimum of 10,000 watts at night, if grandfathered), certain existing Mexican Class A stations, and certain new Cuban Class A stations are authorized to operate at a higher power. Certain Mexican Class A stations are authorized to operate at less than 50,000 watts at night, if grandfathered, but may operate at up to 100,000 watts during the day.
 Class B and D stations can be found on any frequencies from 540 kHz to 1700 kHz except where frequencies have been reserved for Class C stations.
 Class C stations can be found in the lower 48 US states on the frequencies of 1230 kHz, 1240 kHz, 1340 kHz, 1400 kHz, 1450 kHz, and 1490 kHz (commonly known as "graveyard" frequencies). Other countries may use other frequencies for their Class C stations.
 American territories in ITU region 3 with AM broadcasting stations (Guam and the Northern Mariana Islands) use the 9 kHz spacing customary to the rest of the world. All stations are class B or lower. 
 Canada also defines Class CC (Carrier Current, restricted to the premises) and LP.  (less than 100 watts)
 TIS stations can be found on any frequency from 530 kHz to 1700 kHz in the US, but may only carry non-commercial messages without music. There is a network of TISs on 1710 in New Jersey.
 Low-power AM stations located on a school campus are allowed to be more powerful, so long as their signal strength does not exceed roughly 14 to 45 µV/m (microvolts per meter) (depending on frequency) at a distance of 30 meters (98.4 ft) from campus.

Former system
AM station classes were previously assigned Roman numerals from I to IV in the US, with subclasses indicated by a letter suffix. Current class A is equivalent to the old class I; class B is the old classes II and III, with class D being the II-D, II-S, and III-S subclasses; and class C is the old class IV.

The following conversion table compares the old AM station classes with the new AM station classes:

{| class="wikitable"
|-
! Old Domestic Station Class
! New Domestic Station Class
|-
| I
| A
|-
| II
| B
|-
| III
| B
|-
| IV
| C
|-
| II-S
| D
|-
| III-S
| D
|-
| II-D(Daytime Only)
| D
|}

AM station classes and clear channels listed by frequency 

The following chart lists frequencies on the broadcast company band, and which classes broadcast on these frequencies; Class A and Class B, 10,000 watt and higher (full-time) stations in North America which broadcast on clear-channel station frequencies are also shown.

By international agreement, Class A stations must be 10,000 watts and above, with a 50,000 watt maximum for the US and Canada, but no maximum for other governments in the region. Mexico, for example, typically runs 150,000 to 500,000 watts, but some stations are grandfathered at 10,000 to 20,000 watts at night; by treaty, these sub-50,000 watt Mexican stations may operate with a maximum of 100,000 watts during the daytime.

Because the AM broadcast band developed before technology suitable for directional antennas, there are numerous exceptions, such as the US use of 800 (kHz) and 900 non-directionally in Alaska, limited to 5 kW at night; and 1050 and 1220, directionally, in the continental US, and without time limits; each of these being assigned to specific cities (and each of these being Mexican Class I-A clear channels). In return for these limits on US stations, Mexico accepted limits on 830 and 1030 in Mexico City, non-directionally, restricted to 5 kW at night (both of these being US Class I-A clear channels).

FM

Station class description

Notes:
 Canada protects all radio stations out to a signal strength of 0.5mV/m (54dBu), whereas only commercial B stations in the US are. Commercial B1 in the US is 0.7mV/m (57dBu), and all other stations are 1.0mV/m (60dBu). Noncommercial-band stations (88.1 to 91.9) are not afforded this protection, and are treated as C3 and C2 even when they are B1 or B. C3 and C2 may also be reported internationally as B1 and B, respectively.
 Class C0 is for former C stations, demoted at request of another station which needs the downgrade to accommodate its own facilities.
 In practice, many stations are above the maximum HAAT for a particular class, and correspondingly must downgrade their power to remain below the reference distance. Conversely, they may not increase power if they are below maximum HAAT.
 All class D (including L1 and L2 LPFM and translator) stations are secondary in the US, and can be bumped or forced off-air completely, even if they are not just a repeater and are the only station a licensee has.
 The United States is divided into regions that have different restrictions for FM stations. Zone I (much of the US Northeast and Midwest) and I-A (most of California, plus Puerto Rico) is limited to classes B and B1, while Zone II (everything else) has only the C classes. All areas have the same classes for A and D.
 Power and height restrictions were put in place in 1962. A number of previously existing stations were grandfathered in, such as KVYB in Santa Barbara, California and WMC-FM in Memphis, Tennessee.

The following table lists the various classes of FM stations, the reference facilities for each station class, and the protected and city grade contours for each station class:

Historically, there were local "Class A" frequencies (like AM radio's class C stations) to which only class A stations would be allocated & the other frequencies could not have a class A. According to the 1982 FCC rules & regulations, those frequencies were: 92.1, 92.7, 93.5, 94.3, 95.3, 95.9, 96.7, 97.7, 98.3, 99.3, 100.1, 100.9, 101.7, 102.3, 103.1, 103.9, 104.9, 105.5, 106.3 & 107.1.

FM zones 

The US is divided into three zones for FM broadcasting: I, I-A and II. The zone where a station is located may limit the choices of broadcast class available to a given FM station.

Zone I in the US includes all of Connecticut, the District of Columbia, Delaware, Illinois, Indiana, Massachusetts, Maryland, New Jersey, Ohio, Pennsylvania, Rhode Island, and West Virginia. It also includes the areas south of latitude 43.5°N in Michigan, New Hampshire, New York, and Vermont; as well as coastal Maine, southeastern Wisconsin, and northern and eastern Virginia.

Zone I-A includes California south of 40°N, as well as Puerto Rico and the US Virgin Islands.

Zone II includes the remainder of the continental US, plus Alaska and Hawaii.

In Zones I and I-A, there are no Class C, C0, or C1 stations.  However, there are a few Class B stations with grandfathered power limits in excess of 50 KW, such as WETA (licensed for Washington DC in zone I, at a power of 75 kW ERP), WNCI (Columbus, Ohio in zone I, at 175 kW ERP), KPFK (Los Angeles in zone I-A, at 110 KW ERP), and the most extreme example being WBCT (Grand Rapids, Michigan, in zone I, at 320  kW ERP).

TV

Full-power stations in the US 

Notes:

All full-power analog television station transmissions in the US were terminated at midnight Eastern Daylight Time on June 12, 2009.  Many broadcasters replaced their analog signal with their digital ATSC signal on the same transmission channel at that time.

 All US digital stations received a -DT suffix during the analog-to-digital transition.  At analog shutdown, the FCC assigned to each digital station the call sign its associated analog station had used.  (with a -TV suffix if the analog station had this suffix, without the -TV suffix if the analog station didn't have it).  Stations could optionally choose to keep the -DT suffix.  Most stations did not keep the -DT suffix.
 For US analog stations, the -TV suffix was required if there was a radio station with the same three- or four-letter callsign.  Stations not required to use the -TV suffix may optionally request it if desired.
 Analog audio power was limited to 22% of video.

Full-power stations in Canada 
 Class A: UHF, 10 kW video/ EHAAT
 Class B: UHF, 100 kW video/ EHAAT
 Class C: UHF,  video/ EHAAT (?)
 Class D: UHF, more than / EHAAT
 Class R: VHF, 100 kW low-band (channels 2–6), 325 kW high-band.  (channels 7-13)
 Class S: VHF, more than 100 kW low-band/325 kW high-band.

Notes:
 Official definitions of these classes are difficult to locate.  The values above are inferred from the Industry Canada database.  There is some ambiguity about the difference between Classes C and D.
 Power-level limitations are not firmly enforced in Canada, and Industry Canada has been known to license stations for power levels much higher than the generally accepted limits.
 In Canada, the callsigns of all private TV stations have the -TV suffix.  Most CBC Television and Ici Radio-Canada Télé TV callsigns end in the letter T and have no suffix.  A few Radio-Canada stations, purchased by the CBC from private owners, retain the old -TV callsigns.
 Canadian digital stations all receive the -DT suffix.  (this includes CBC and Radio-Canada stations)  The Industry Canada database shows -PT suffixes for the channel allotments for permanent post-transition digital operation but when licences are issued for these permanent digital stations, -DT callsigns are used.

Low-power TV (US) 

LPTV (secondary) (suffix: -LP, or a sequential-numbered callsign in format W##XX with no suffix for analog or with -D suffix for digital, or -LD for low-power digital stations):
 VHF: 3 kW analog video; 3 kW digital 
 UHF: 150 kW analog video; 15 kW digital
 Experimental
 Unlicensed: not allowed except for medical telemetry, and certain wireless microphones

The LPTV (low-power television) service was created in 1982 by the FCC to allocate channels for smaller, local stations, and community channels, such as public access stations.  LPTV stations that meet additional requirements such as children's "E/I" core programming and Emergency Alert System broadcasting capabilities can qualify for a Class A (-CA) license.

Broadcast translators, boosters, and other LPTV stations are considered secondary to full-power stations, unless they have upgraded to class A. Class A is still considered LPTV with respect to stations in Canada and Mexico.

Class A television (US) 

Class-A stations (US) (suffix: -CA or -CD for digital class A):
 VHF: 3 kW analog video; 3 kW digital
 UHF: 150 kW analog video; 15 kW digital

The class-A television class is a variant of LPTV created in 2000 by the FCC to allocate and protect some low-power affiliates. Class-A stations are still low-power, but are protected from RF interference and from having to change channel should a full-service station request that channel.

Additionally, class-A stations, LPTV stations, and translators are the only stations currently authorized to broadcast both analog and digital signals, unlike full-power stations which must broadcast a digital signal only.

Low-power TV (Canada) 
In Canada, there is no formal transmission power below which, a television transmitter is considered broadcasting at low power.  Industry Canada considers that a low power digital television undertaking "shall not normally extend a distance of 20 km in any direction from the antenna site," based on the determined noise-limited bounding contour.

Mexico 
All digital television stations in Mexico have -TDT callsign suffixes. Analog stations, which existed until December 31, 2016, had -TV callsign suffixes.

The equivalent of low power or translator service in Mexico is the equipo complementario de zona de sombra, which is intended only to fill in gaps between a station's expected and actual service area caused by terrain; a station of this type shares the callsign of another station. In analog, these services often were broadcast on the same or adjacent channels to their parent station, except in certain areas with tight packing of television stations (such as central Mexico). In digital, these services usually operate on the same RF channel as their parent station, except for those with conflicting full-power applications (XHBS-TDT Cd. Obregón, Son., channel 30 instead of 25), in certain other cases where it is technically not feasible (XHAW-TDT Guadalupe, NL, channel 26 instead of 25) or to make way for eventual repacking on upper UHF (XHPNW-TDT has four shadows on 33, its post-repacking channel, instead of 39).

Equipos complementarios can relay their parent station, or a station that carries 75% or more of the same programming as its parent station.

Stations of either type may have unusually low or high effective radiated powers. XHSMI-TDT in Oaxaca is licensed for two watts in digital. The highest-powered shadows are XEQ-TDT Toluca and XHBS-TDT Ciudad Obregón, both at 200 kW.

FCC service table 
The United States Federal Communications Commission lists the following services on their website for television broadcasting:

See also 
 Call signs in North America - How call signs and classes are used in North America
 ITU prefix - How callsigns and classes are used worldwide
 Low-power broadcasting
 Class A television service

References

External links 
 FCC AM classes
 FCC FM classes
 FCC LPTV Facts
 FCC Class-A TV Information

Broadcast engineering
Broadcast station classes, North America